Chris LaMartina is an American director, writer, and producer that works out of Baltimore, Maryland. 

The youngest of three children, early childhood influences include the film Night of the Demons, the animated series The Real Ghostbusters and the stories of his grandmother in the oral tradition. He studied film at Towson University, during which time he filmed the 2007 movie Dead Teenagers. 

He is known  for his motion pictures, WNUF Halloween Special (2013) and Call Girl of Cthulhu (2014). Since 2011, he has been working in marketing and advertising as a Creative Director as well as Director of Storytelling for several mid-Atlantic-based ad agencies.

Filmography
Dead Teenagers (2007)
Book of Lore (2007)
Grave Mistakes (2008)
President's Day (2010)
Lost Trailer Park: Never Coming Attractions (2010 - 2011, 9 episodes)
Yestermessenger (2011)
Witch's Brew (2013)
WNUF Halloween Special (2013)
Call Girl of Cthulhu (2014)
What Happens Next Will Scare You (2020)
Out There Halloween Mega Tape (aka WNUF Halloween Sequel) (2022)

References

External links
 

Living people
Writers from Baltimore
Film directors from Maryland
Horror film directors
Towson University alumni
Year of birth missing (living people)